Milab (also Romanized as Mīlāb; also known as Ḩājīābād, Ḩājjīābād, and Ḩājjīābād-e Mīlāb) is a village in Gamasiyab Rural District, in the Central District of Nahavand County, Hamadan Province, Iran. At the 2006 census, its population was 651, in 181 families.

References 

Populated places in Nahavand County